Jerome Herbert Skolnick (born 1931) is a professor at New York University and a former president of the American Society of Criminology. He is also affiliated with the University of California, Berkeley. Skolnick has a Ph.D. in sociology from Yale University.

Clearance Rates

Jerome Skolnick has argued that clearance rates demonstrate the reality of the criminal justice conflict model by encouraging police to focus on appearing to do their job, rather than on actually doing their job. This is a comparable argument to that regarding standardized testing, and "teaching to the test". Skolnick noted one incident where police coerced a man to confess to over 400 burglaries so that they could have a high rate of crime solving (clearance).

Quotes

"The law often, but not always, supports police deception."
"Courtroom lying is justified within the police culture by the same sort of necessity rationale that courts have permitted police to employ at the investigative stage: The end justifies the means."

Writings by Jerome Skolnick

Most of his writings deal with criminal justice.

Personal life

While attending Yale Law School, Jerome married Arlene Silberstein in New Haven, Connecticut.  Jerome and Arlene are the parents of Alex Skolnick, lead guitarist for the thrash metal band Testament,and Michael Skolnick, an English teacher.

Both Jerome and Arlene are Jewish.

Further reading

References

1931 births
Living people
American criminologists
20th-century American Jews
Place of birth missing (living people)
21st-century American Jews